The Type V ship is a United States Maritime Commission (MARCOM) designation for World War II tugboats. Type V was used in World War II, Korean War, and the Vietnam War. Type V ships were used to move ships and barges. Type V tugboats were made of either steel or wood hulls. There were four types of tugboats ordered for World War II. The V4-M-A1 design was used by a number of manufacturers; a total of 49 were built. A smaller steel hull tugboat was the  V2-ME-A1; 26 were built. The largest wooden hull was the  V3-S-AH2, of which 14 were built. The smaller wooden hull was the  V2-M-AL1, which 35 were built. Most V2-M-AL1 tugboats were sent to the United Kingdom for the war efforts under the lend-lease act. The Type V tugs served across the globe during World War II including: Pacific War, European theatre, and in the United States. SS Farallon, and other Type V tugs, were used to help built Normandy ports, including Mulberry harbour, on D-Day, 6 June 1944, and made nine round trips to Normandy to deliver Phoenix breakwaters.

Tugboats are used to maneuver vessels and barges by pushing or towing them. Tugs are needed to move vessels that either should not move by themselves, such as large ships in a crowded harbor or a narrow canal, or those that can not move by themselves, like as barges, disabled ships, or log rafts. Tugboats are powerful for their small size and are strongly built. Early tugboats used steam engines, but most have diesel engines now. Many tugboats have firefighting water cannons, allowing them to assist in firefighting, especially in harbors.

Ships in class

V2-ME-A1
Named for small US ports. On 15 May 1944, they were redesignated YTB, "District Harbor Tug, Large", before finally being designated YTM, "Harbor Tug, Medium", in February 1962. The 26 V2-ME-A1's were built by six different builders; Birchfield Shipbuilding & Boiler Co., Inc., Tacoma, Washington, 6 tugs; Canulette Shipbuilding, Slidell, Louisiana, 4 tugs; Calumet Shipyard & Drydock, Chicago, Illinois, 5 tugs; Ira. S. Bushey & Sons, Brooklyn, New York, 5 tugs; General Ship & Engine Works, East Boston, Massachusetts, 2 tugs; and Brunswick Marine Construction Corporation, Brunswick, Georgia, 4 tugs.

V4-M-A1

Named after lighthouses, the V4-M-A1's were the largest and most powerful tugs in the world when they were built in 1943. The V4-M-A1's were operated by Moran Towing & Transportation, in New York, on behalf of the War Shipping Administration.
Built by: Avondale Marine, in Westego, Louisiana, General Ships & Engine, in East Boston, Pennsylvania Shipyards, in Beaumont, Texas, Globe Shipbuilding, in Superior, Wisconsin, Froemming Brothers, in Milwaukee, Wisconsin, and Pendleton Shipbuilding, in New Orleans, Louisiana.
Seguin, scrapped 1976
Sand Key, scrapped 1977
Sanibel Island, scrapped 1972
Sabine Pass, helped with Normandy landings, Scrapped 1978
Point Loma, scrapped 1972
Anacapa, scrapped 1973
Point Vicente, sold to Mexico, 1969, renamed Huitilopochtli (A 51)
Point Arguello, scrapped 1973
Matagorda,	sank 1946
Aransas Pass, scrapped 1973
Sombrero Key, sold to Argentina, 1965, renamed Thompson, scrapped
Dry Tortugas, sold to Argentina, 1965, renamed Goyena, scrapped
Southwest Pass, scrapped 1973
Montauk Point, sold to Mexico, 1969, renamed Quetzalcoatl (A 12)
Moose Peak, helped with Normandy landings, sold to Mexico, 1969, sank 1974
Boon Island, sank 1976
Gay Head, helped with Normandy landings, scrapped 1977
Bodie Island, helped with Normandy landings, scrapped 1973
Great Isaac, helped with Normandy landings, sank 1947, collision with Norwegian freighter Bandeirante
Tybee,	scrapped 1978
Point Sur,	scrapped 1974
Farallon,	used to build Normandy port on D-Day, 6 June 1944, made 9 round trips to Normandy, sold to Mexico, 1969, scrapped 1978
Point Cabrillo, scrapped 1974
Trinidad Head,	helped with Normandy landings, Scrapped 1969
Scotch Cap, scrapped
Watch Hill, scrapped 1973
Wood Island, scrapped 1973
Sands Point, scrapped 1982
Point Judith, scrapped 1978
Black Rock, helped with Normandy landings, Scrapped 1969
Sankaty Head, helped with Normandy landings, Scrapped 1978
Yaqina Head, sold private 1971, scrapped
Bald Island, scrapped 1973
Fire Island, scrapped 1972
Libby Island, sold private 1971, scrapped
St. Simon,	scrapped 1977
Petit Manan, scrapped 1976
Burnt Island, sold too Mexico 1969, scrapped 1979
Stratford Point, scrapped 1978
Two Harbors, scrapped 1972
White Shoal, sold private 1975, scrapped
Cubits Gap, scrapped 1976
Hillsboro Inlet, helped with Normandy landings, Scrapped 1977
Jupiter Inlet,	sold private 1971, scrapped
Pigeon Point, sold too Mexico, 1969, scrapped 1970
Point Arena, scrapped 1976
Bayou St. John, scrapped 1977
Mobile Point, sank 1944
Race Point, scrapped 1972

V3-S-AH2

Some were classed as YTB-"District Harbor Tug Large". They had triple-expansion reciprocating engines producing . The V3-S-AH2's were manned by a crew of 27. They were built by Corpus Christi Shipyard, Corpus Christi, Texas,  Puget Sound SB Company, Olympia, Washington, Standard Shipbuilding Company, San Pedro, California, and Astoria Shipbuilding, Astoria, Oregon. 
Sustainer,	intended for the United Kingdom, as Atworth but sold to USSR
Compeller, sold to the United Kingdom, renamed Atherida, sold private 1948, scrapped
Dexterous,	sold to the United Kingdom, renamed Athelney, sold to Trinidad, 1945, to Caymans, 1948, scrapped 1951
Mighty, sold to the United Kingdom, renamed Atil, sold private 1948, scrapped
Secure, sold to the United Kingdom, renamed Attigny, sold private 1948, scrapped 1955
Forthright, sold to the United Kingdom, renamed Attock, to USN renamed YTB 610, to USSR 1944 renamed Forthright
Power, sold to the United Kingdom, renamed Atengo, sold to Italy, 1947 renamed Titano, scrapped 1974
Steadfast,	sold to the United Kingdom, renamed Atako, wrecked and lost, 1944
Durable, sold to the United Kingdom, renamed Ataran, to Italy, 1947, renamed Ciclope, scrapped
Spirited, sold to the United Kingdom, renamed Atolia, to Trinidad, 1948, to Caymans 1951, scrapped
Helper, sold to the United Kingdom, renamed Atoyac, to Italy, 1949, renamed Nereo
Resister, sold to the United Kingdom, renamed Atiamuri, sold to Italy, 1947, sold to Israel, 1954
Superb, sold to the United Kingdom, renamed Atwood, sold to Trinidad, 1948, sold to Caymans, 1951, scrapped
Robust, sold to the United Kingdom, renamed Atmore, sold private, 1948, scrapped

V2-M-AL1

Port Sewall class tug. Named for American ports. All but one tug went for Lend-Lease use, some serviced in the Mediterranean Sea in WW2. V2-M-AL1 were: Wood hull, 90 tons, beam 19 foot, diesel engine with 240 horsepower, fuel Oil: 1920 gallons. Built by Puget Sound SB, Standard SB, Steinbach IW, Eureka Shipbuilding, Arlington SB, Texas SB, Siletz BW, Blair Company, Marinette Marine and Texas SB.
Port Sewall	To the United Kingdom as a "TUSA" Tug, USA. (YN 1563)
Port Kennedy	To the United Kingdom as a "TUSA" YN 1564
Port Reading	To the United Kingdom as a "TUSA" YN 1565
Port Costa	To the United Kingdom as a "TUSA" YN 1
Port San Luis	To the United Kingdom as a "TUSA" YN 2
Port Chicago	To the United Kingdom as a "TUSA" YN 3
Port Gamble	To the United Kingdom as a "TUSA" YN 4
Port Tobacco	To the United Kingdom as a "TUSA" YN 5
Port Haywood	To US Navy renamed YTL 718, sold private 1947 renamed Limpiar. (YTL= District Harbor Tug Small)
Port Inglis	To the United Kingdom as a "TUSA"
Port Mayaca	To the United Kingdom as a "TUSA"
Port Orange	To the United Kingdom as a "TUSA"
Port Richey	To the United Kingdom as a "TUSA"
Port St. Joe	To the United Kingdom as a "TUSA"
Port Tampa City To the United Kingdom as a "TUSA"
Port Arthur	To the United Kingdom as a "TUSA"
Port Bolivar	To the United Kingdom as a "TUSA"
Port Lavaca	To the United Kingdom as a "TUSA"
Port Neches	To the United Kingdom as a "TUSA"
Port O'Connor	To the United Kingdom as a "TUSA"
Port Sullivan	To the United Kingdom as a "TUSA"
Port Stanley	To the United Kingdom as a "TUSA"
Port Townsend	To the United Kingdom as a "TUSA"
Port Ewen	To the United Kingdom as a "TUSA"
Port Gibson	To the United Kingdom as a "TUSA"
Port Jefferson	To the United Kingdom as a "TUSA"
Port Leyden	To the United Kingdom as a "TUSA"
Port Austin	To the United Kingdom as a "TUSA"
Port Homer	To the United Kingdom as a "TUSA"
Port Hope	To the United Kingdom as a "TUSA"
Port Sanilac	To the United Kingdom as a "TUSA"
Port William	To the United Kingdom as a "TUSA"
Port Wing	To the United Kingdom as a "TUSA"
Port Sulphur	To the United Kingdom as a "TUSA"
Port Treverton	To the United Kingdom as a "TUSA"

ATR-1 class rescue tug

ATR-1-class - Auxiliary Tug Rescue was a wooden hulled rescue tug that was built by Wheeler SB, Northwest Shipbuilding, Frank L. Sample, Jakobson Shipyard, Camden SB, Lynch SB, and Fulton Shipyard in 1944 and 1945. The 89 ATR-1 tugs serviced WW2 in both Asiatic-Pacific Theater and the European theatre of World War II. The 40 ATR-1 Class had a displacement of 852 ton lite and 1,315 ton fully loaded. They had a length of 165' 6", a beam of 33' 4" and draft of 15' 6". Top speed of 12.2 knots. The largest boom had a capacity of 4 tons. They were armed with one 3-inch/50-caliber gun and two single Oerlikon 20 mm cannon. The crew complement was five Officers and 47 Enlisted men. They had a fuel capacity of 1,620 Bbls. The propulsion was one Fulton Iron Works vertical triple-expansion reciprocating steam engine with two Babcock and Wilcox "D"-type boilers with a single propeller of 1,600shp. They had two turbo drive Ships Service Generators, rated at 60 kW 120 V D.C. Example is USS ATR-31

Cherokee-class tugboat

The [[Cherokee-class tugboat|Cherokee class]] of fleet tugboats, originally known as the Navajo class, were built for the US Navy for World War II with a displacement of 1,235 long tons (1,255 t). Had a length of 205 ft (62 m), a beam of 38 ft 6 in (11.73 m), a draft of 18 ft (5.5 m). Has propulsion of a diesel-electric engine with 1 shaft at 3,600 hp (2,685 kW) and a top speed of 16.5 knots. Class AT for Auxiliary Tug. Built by	Bethlehem Mariners Harbor, Staten Island, 	Charleston Shipbuilding and Drydock Company, and United Engineering Co. Example: USS Navajo (AT-64).

Abnaki-class tugboatAbnaki-class tugboat were Ocean fleet tugboats that were built for the US Navy for World War II with a displacement of 1,589 tons, a length of 205 ft 0 in (62.48 m), a beam of 38 ft 6 in (11.73 m), and a draft of 15 ft 4 in (4.67 m). They had a propulsion of:  4 × General Motors 12-278A diesel main engines, 4 × General Electric generators, 3 × General Motors 3-268A auxiliary services engines, with a single screw of 3,600 shp (2,700 kW) and a top speed:	16.5 knots. Class ATF for Auxiliary Tug Fleet. Built by Charleston Shipbuilding & Drydock. Example: USS Abnaki (ATF-96).

Sotoyomo-class tugboat

Sotoyomo-class tugboat were tugboats that were built for the US Navy for World War II with a displacement of 534 long tons (543 t) light, 835 long tons (848 t) full, a length of 143 ft (44 m), a beam of 33 ft (10 m) and a draft of 13 ft (4.0 m). They had a propulsion of diesel-electric engine with a single screw and a top speed of 13 knots. Harbor tugs (YT) were named after American Indian tribes:  Example tug is the USS Ontario (AT-13)

Cahto-class district harbor tug

Cahto-class district harbor tug was a harbour tug of the US Navy with a displacement of 410 long tons (417 t), a length of 110 ft 0 in (33.53 m), a beam of 27 ft 0 in (8.23 m) and a draft of 11 ft 4 in (3.45 m). They had a propulsion of diesel-electric engine with a single screw and a top speed of 12 knots. A crew of 12. Sample tug: USS Cahto (YTB-215). Built by Kneass Boat Works, Anderson & Cristofani, Puget Sound Naval Shipyard, Norfolk Naval Shipyard, Consolidated Shipbuilding Corp., Defoe Shipbuilding Company, Gulfport Shipbuilding Corporation, Gibbs Gas Engine, Bushey & Sons Shipyard, W. A. Robinson, Greenport Basin, Mathis, Elizabeth City, Stone Boat Yard, Martinac, Ira Bushey, Luders Marine, Westergard, Everett-Pacific, United States Coast Guard Yard, Commercial Iron Works and Bethlehem Shipbuilding San Pedro.

Hisada class harbor tug
Hisada class harbor tug is a subclass of Cahto-class district harbor tug. Hisada class harbor had the same design as the 260-ton Cahto-class district harbor tug.
Harbor tugs (YT) were named after American Indian tribes. Example tugs: USS Nabigwon (YTB-521) and USS Wabanquot (YTB-525).

Woban Class District Harbor Tug
Woban Class District Harbor Tug is a subclass of Cahto-class district harbor tug. Hisada class harbor had the same design as the 260-ton Cahto-class district harbor tug.
Harbor tugs (YT) were named after American Indian tribes. Built by Pacific Coast Engineering, Puget Sound Navy Yard, and Consolidated Shipbuilding Corporation. Example tugs: Hoga (YT-146) and USS Nokomis (YT-142).

US Army

For World War 2 the US Army had tugboats built to move cargo barges in harbors. The Army often called the tug a Sea Mule, used to move US Army barges.
 Small wood US Army MTL Harbor Tugboats, 14 model 324-A with a length of 47 feet, a beam of 12 feet. MTL is for Motor Towing Launch. The Army had built 1,251 marine tractors (MT) and marine tow launches (MTL) by 41 boatbuilders. MT tugs were either 26 feet or 36 feet (Design 329) in length and the MTL were 46 feet.
 US Army TP Harbor Tug with displacement 185 tons gross, a length of 96 feet, a beam 25 feet, a draft of 11 feet, Power one Fairbanks–Morse six cylinder diesel engine to a single propeller with 450 shp. The TP is for "Tug/Passenger". The US Army had 43 of this 96-foot tugs built for World War 2, Ackerman Boat Company` built 15 of them.
 US Army had built 170 of the 65-foot, diesel-powered, passenger / cargo boats. These could also be used as harbor tugs. These were known as tug-transports, or T-boats.

Bagaduce-class tugboat WW1
Bagaduce-class tugboat were World War 1 tug boats used in World War 1 and World War 2. Durning World War 1 these were called YMT-Yard Motor Tug. Engineered with a displacement of 1,000 long tons (1,016 t) (normal) and a length of 156 ft 8 in (47.75 m), a beam of 30 ft (9.1 m) and a draft of 14 ft 7 in (4.45 m), with a top speed of 12.4 knots. USS Example USS Sagamore (AT-20).

Arapaho-class fleet tug WW1

Arapaho-class fleet tug were World War 1 tug boats used in World War 1 and World War 2.
Engineered with a displacement of 575 tons and a length of 122 ft 6 in (37.34 m), a beam of 24 ft (7.3 m) and a draft of 12 ft 10 in (3.91 m), with a top speed of 11 knots.
Ships in class:
AT-14 	Arapaho  later renamed: YT-121 in 1936 then sold in 1937, renamed Evridiki in 1960, sold and renamed Faneromini in 1968. Scrapped in 1986.
USS Mohave (AT-15) Wrecked in 1928.
AT-16 	Tillamook later renamed YT-122 in 1936, renamed YTM-122 in 1944. Scrapped in 1947

Canada Tugs

Modified Ocean Warrior-class Tugs built by Kingston Ship Builder in Kingston ON. GT of 233 tons, 105 feet long, Beam of 26.2' and Draft of 12.5' with 1000HP, max of 14 knots, Steel hull, built between 1945 and 1946.

Rockglen
Rockforest
Rockpigeon
Rockdoe
Rockswift
Rockelm
Rockswift
Rockwing
Rockcliffe
Rockmount
Rockport
Rockland
Rockhill
Rockwood
Rockruby
Rockhawk
Rockthrush
Rockcrystal

Notable incidents 

Sonoma tug sank off Dio Island in action at San Pedro Bay, Leyte Gulf, Philippines when an enemy bomber crashed into her on 24 October 1944.
USS Partridge (AM-16) a Minesweeper, converted to a tug, Ocean Tug AT-138, sank after a torpedo from a German E-Boat hit on 11 June 1944.
Matagorda a V4-M-A1 tug, sank in 1946.
Boon Island a V4-M-A1 tug, sank in 1976.
Moose Peak a V4-M-A1 tug, sank in 1974. She was a Merchant Marine Ship at Normandy.
Great Isaac a V4-M-A1 tug, sank in 1947.
MV 'Mobile Point' a V4-M-A1 tug sank on 23 December 1944 after collided with the SS Beaton Park, a British cargo ship off the coast of Oregon, near the Nestucca Bay National Wildlife Refuge.
YTL-566 sank on the way to Vietnam in the vicinity of Côn Sơn Island, during the Vietnam War.
YTL-199 sank in 1946.
Triton (YT-10) fleet tug, sank with all the crew on 30 December 1962 in storm off Huntington, Long Island, New York.
USS Pokagon (YT-274) sank near Green Cove Springs, Fla. after she capsized on 27 September 1947.
USS Shahaka (YTB-368) sank after colliding with USS ABSD-2, a floating drydock, midway between the California coast and the Hawaiian Islands at 27° 21'N 136° 29'W in June 1944.
USS Secota (YTM-415),  Sank in collision with submarine, USS Georgia (SSGN-729) on 22 March 1986 near Midway Atoll.
YT-198 sank after hitting a mine off the Anzio beachhead on 18 February 1944.
USS Iona (YTB-220) sank after a fire in June 1963.
ATA-214 Palo Blanco renamed Radnik sank in storm off Syria in 1953.
ATR-64 renamed La Lumiere sank at mooring in 2008 in Britannia Beach BC.
AT-171 sank after a collision off the Azores in 1944.Wrecked off Okinawa 9 Oct. 1945
USS Mohave (AT-15) ran aground and was wrecked on 13 February 1928 in Massachusetts Bay.
USS Arapaho (ATF-68) as ARA Comandante General Zapiola in the Argentine Navy ran aground on a reef off Antarctica and sank on 10 January 1976.
 ATF-117 USS Wateree was wrecked and sank off Okinawa on 9 Oct. 1945.
USS Grebe was wrecked and sank off Fiji on 9 October 1945 with a loss of eight of crew.
AT-200 Sold and renamed Leucolon (PP 61) was wrecked and sank in 1965.
ATR-15 was wrecked and sank off Normandy on 19 June 1944.
AT-31 USS Koka was wrecked and sank in 1938 off San Clemente Island.
AT-166 Chetco sold and renamed Neptune sank after collision in 1948
AT-191 sunk by typhoon Louise at Okinawa on 9 Oct. 1945.
AT-210 USS Catawba renamed ARA Comodoro Somellera (A10)sank in 1998.

See also
 Type B ship
 Sotoyomo-class fleet tug
 Pusher tug
 Victory ships
 Liberty ship
 Type C1 ship
 Type C2 ship
 Type C3 ship
 United States Merchant Marine Academy
 List of auxiliaries of the United States Navy
Wooden boats of World War 2

References

Bibliography

External links
tugboatinformation.com

Ship types
World War II merchant ships of the United States
Auxiliary tugboat classes